The fabric shaver (also known as a lint shaver or fuzz remover) is a handheld electrical device that has a rotating blade underneath a blade net. It allows users to remove fuzz and pills on a fabric without damaging the fabric. It can be applied on different fabric-made items such as bedding, curtain or carpet, but mostly used for removing fuzz on clothes, especially sweaters, hoodies, or clothes made from wool, angora or cashmere.
Fabric shavers are normally powered either by non-rechargeable dry cells, or with an internal rechargeable battery and an external charger. To use the fabric shaver, all the user has to do is check its battery and then press the on/off button to turn on the motor.

Usage 
A shaver is useful in removing pilling formed on woolen or other clothes due to prolonged usage.

References 

Textiles
Maintenance
Domestic implements